The Hellboy Universe is the fictional universe of the Hellboy comic and its various spinoffs, created by Mike Mignola. Its first appearance was in a black-and-white, four-page promotional comic by Mike Mignola with a script by John Byrne published by Dark Horse Comics in San Diego Comic-Con Comics #2 (August 19, 1993), distributed at the San Diego Comic-Con. The Hellboy Universe currently spans over eighty trade paperbacks. It is also sometimes informally called the "Mignolaverse".

Hellboy Universe titles

Hellboy
The series, focused on the titular Hellboy, spawned the Hellboy Universe. There are generally two types of Hellboy stories; Pre-Cavendish (stories set chronologically before the first miniseries Hellboy: Seed of Destruction) and Post-Cavendish (stories set chronologically after the first miniseries). Post-Cavendish stories are usually very continuity heavy, and require the reader to be relatively familiar with Hellboy's history. Pre-Cavendish stories tend to be primarily short, stand-alone stories.

In addition to the comics, the Hellboy novels written by author Christopher Golden are also considered in-continuity.

In addition to the standard trade paperbacks, Hellboy stories are collected in oversized hardcovers known as library editions, and paperback omnibuses.

Hellboy in Hell
Unlike previous Hellboy stories, Hellboy in Hell was an ongoing series. It was not a monthly series, but rather a new issue came out when it was finished. When there was an arc spanning multiple issues, each of those issues came out monthly.

Hellboy and the B.P.R.D.
On July 8, 2014, just prior to SDCC 2014, Entertainment Weekly and Nerdist announced Hellboy and the B.P.R.D., a series that was simultaneously a spinoff of both Hellboy and B.P.R.D. Each volume focuses on a single year, beginning the year Hellboy first became a Bureau agent, 1952.

Young Hellboy
A new series focused on young Hellboy in the 1940s was announced November 2020.

B.P.R.D.
B.P.R.D. (Bureau for Paranormal Research and Defense) began as an experiment to see if the Hellboy Universe could be expanded with stories without Hellboy in them. It started with an untitled three-page promotional piece before launching into the three-issue miniseries Hollow Earth. As the series grew, it was split into "story cycles." There are three major cycles: Plague of Frogs, Hell on Earth, and The Devil You Know, as well as two minor cycles 1946–1948 and Vampire. The trade B.P.R.D.: Being Human is the only remaining book from the original series that is not a part of any existing story cycle.

The short story Casualties was collected in the Abe Sapien omnibuses.

First Cycle: B.P.R.D.: Plague of Frogs
The Plague of Frogs cycle was published from 2002 to 2010, though it was not known as such at the time. When it came time to collect the stories into omnibus editions, the material collected in trades 1–8, 10–12, and 14 was retroactively retitled B.P.R.D.: Plague of Frogs. Guy Davis was the primary artist on the series and John Arcudi joined Mike Mignola as co-writer with the miniseries The Dead in 2004. Plague of Frogs is collected in the four volumes of the B.P.R.D.: Plague of Frogs Omnibus Editions (three trades in each volume).

Second Cycle: B.P.R.D.: Hell on Earth
B.P.R.D.: Hell on Earth is a direct continuation of the B.P.R.D.: Plague of Frogs cycle dealing with the apocalyptic events in the wake of the Frog War. For the one hundredth issue, it officially shifted from a series of miniseries to a monthly ongoing series. John Arcudi is the lead writer with Mike Mignola. Unlike the previous cycle, which was visually defined by mostly a single artist, Hell on Earth had many artists on the title.

Third Cycle: B.P.R.D.: The Devil You Know
Following B.P.R.D.: Plague of Frogs and B.P.R.D.: Hell on Earth is the third and final story cycle of B.P.R.D.. Scott Allie is the lead writer with Mike Mignola. The primary artist on the title is Laurence Campbell.

B.P.R.D.: 1946–1948
The 1946–1948 cycle deals with the early years of the B.P.R.D. The cycle was originally planned to go for longer, on into the 1950s, but it was cut short because Mike Mignola felt he had too many books going on. Joshua Dysart was the lead writer for this series, although the final miniseries was written by John Arcudi to connect with what he was doing in B.P.R.D.: Hell on Earth. In addition to 1946, 1947 and 1948, the series also includes the short stories Bishop Olek’s Devil and And What Shall I Find There?

The trades B.P.R.D.: 1946 and B.P.R.D.: 1947 were originally volumes 9 and 13 of the original B.P.R.D. numbering before the B.P.R.D.: Plague of Frogs omnibuses were devised. Reprints of these volumes did not have numbers on their spines after the release of the Plague of Frogs omnibuses.

B.P.R.D.: Vampire
This was discreetly introduced as a new cycle of B.P.R.D. when the trade come out with a number 1 on its spine and "B.P.R.D.: Vampire" written in the series box (instead of just the usual "B.P.R.D."). Picking up after B.P.R.D.: 1948, Vampire follows the story of B.P.R.D. Agent Simon Anders as he hunts vampires. The cycle is written and drawn by twins Gabriel Bá and Fábio Moon with Mike Mignola. Mike Mignola has said the twins have the freedom to write and draw more stories with this character if they wish.

{|class="wikitable" style="text-align: center"
|+B.P.R.D.: Vampire Collections
|-
! Title !! Story !! Art !! Colors !! Published
|- id="BPRD_Vampire"
|colspan=5 style="background: #b29263;"|B.P.R.D.: VAMPIRE ― VOLUME 1
|-
|Vampire
|Mike Mignolaand Gabriel Bá& Fábio Moon
|Gabriel Bá& Fábio Moon
|rowspan=2|Dave Stewart
|PART 1: March 2013PART 2: April 2013PART 3: May 2013PART 4: June 2013PART 5: July 2013
|-
|Lost Ones(2nd Edition only)
|colspan=2|Gabriel Bá& Fábio Moon
|December 2018
|}

Lobster Johnson
Lobster Johnson is the second Hellboy spinoff, concerning the adventures of a vigilante known as "The Lobster" from 1932 to 1939. The first Lobster Johnson story, The Killer in My Skull (August 11, 1999), was collected in trade paperback under the B.P.R.D. banner. Lobster Johnson properly became its own series when The Iron Prometheus miniseries began (September 5, 2007). John Arcudi became the lead writer with Mike Mignola from 2012's The Burning Hand onward with the stories continuing mostly chronologically from there.

{|class="wikitable" style="text-align: center"
|+Lobster Johnson Collections
|-
! Omnibus Edition !! Title !! Story !! Art !! Colors !! Published
|- id="LoJo_2"
!rowspan=12|LOBSTER JOHNSONVOLUME 1
|colspan=5 style="background: #2c3c6b;"|LOBSTER JOHNSON ― VOLUME 2: THE BURNING HAND
|-
|The Burning Hand
|Mike Mignolaand John Arcudi
|Tonci Zonjic
|Dave Stewart
|PART 1: January 2012PART 2: February 2012PART 3: March 2012PART 4: April 2012PART 5: May 2012
|- id="LoJo_3"
|colspan=5 style="background: #2c3c6b;"|LOBSTER JOHNSON ― VOLUME 3: SATAN SMELLS A RAT
|-
|Caput Mortuum
|rowspan=5|Mike Mignolaand John Arcudi
|Tonci Zonjic
|Dave Stewart
|September 2012
|-
|Satan Smells a Rat
|colspan=2|Kevin Nowlan
|May 2013
|-
|Tony Masso's Finest Hour
|Joe Querio
|rowspan=3|Dave Stewart
|February 2012
|-
|A Scent of Lotus
|Sebastián Fiumara
|PART 1: July 2013PART 2: August 2013
|-
|The Prayer of Neferu
|Wilfredo Torres
|August 2012
|- id="LoJo_4"
|colspan=5 style="background: #2c3c6b;"|LOBSTER JOHNSON ― VOLUME 4: GET THE LOBSTER
|-
|Get the Lobster
|Mike Mignolaand John Arcudi
|Tonci Zonjic
|Dave Stewart
|PART 1: February 2014PART 2: March 2014PART 3: April 2014PART 4: June 2014PART 5: August 2014
|-
!colspan=5|OMNIBUS ONLY
|-
|The Empty Chair
|colspan=3|Tonci Zonjic
|December 2018
|-
|colspan=6|
|- id="LoJo_6"
!rowspan=13|LOBSTER JOHNSONVOLUME 2
|colspan=5 style="background: #2c3c6b;"|LOBSTER JOHNSON ― VOLUME 6: A CHAIN FORGED IN LIFE
|-
|A Chain Forged in Life
|rowspan=5|Mike Mignolaand John Arcudi
|Troy Nixeywith Kevin Nowlan
|Dave Stewartwith Kevin Nowlan
|July 2015
|-
|The Forgotten Man
|Peter Snejbjerg
|Dave Stewart
|April 2016
|-
|The Glass Mantis
|colspan=2|Toni Fejzula
|December 2015
|-
|Garden of Bones
|Stephen Green
|rowspan=2|Dave Stewart
|January 2017
|-
|Mangekyō
|Ben Stenbeck
|August 2017
|- id="LoJo_5"
|colspan=5 style="background: #2c3c6b;"|LOBSTER JOHNSON ― VOLUME 5: THE PIRATE'S GHOST AND METAL MONSTERS OF MIDTOWN
|-
|Metal Monsters of Midtown
|rowspan=2|Mike Mignolaand John Arcudi
|Tonci Zonjic
|Dave Stewart
|PART 1: May 2016PART 2: June 2016PART 3: July 2016
|-
|The Pirate's Ghost
|colspan=2|Tonci Zonjic
|PART 1: March 2017PART 2: April 2017PART 3: May 2017
|- id="LoJo_1"
|colspan=5 style="background: #2c3c6b;"|LOBSTER JOHNSON ― VOLUME 1: THE IRON PROMETHEUS
|-
|The Iron Prometheus
|Mike Mignola
|Jason Armstrong
|Dave Stewart
|PART 1: September 2007PART 2: October 2007PART 3: November 2007PART 4: December 2007PART 5: January 2008
|-
!colspan=5|OMNIBUS ONLY
|-
|The Killer in My Skull
|Mike Mignola
|PENCILS: Matthew Dow SmithINKS: Ryan Sook
|Dave Stewart
|August 1999
|}

Abe Sapien
The first spinoff from Hellboy centred around Abraham Sapien, beginning with Drums of the Dead (March 4, 1998). This story was eventually collected in trade paperback under the B.P.R.D. banner along with the second Abe Sapien story Abe Sapien versus Science (September 8, 1999). It was not until the third Abe Sapien story, The Drowning that this spinoff was collected in trade paperbacks under its own banner.

Dark and Terrible
The series became an ongoing series with Scott Allie as the lead writer with Mike Mignola in April 2013 beginning with the launch of Abe Sapien: Dark and Terrible. Most of the issues in the ongoing run of the series were collected in omnibuses as the story cycle Dark and Terrible.

Sir Edward Grey

Witchfinder
This Hellboy spinoff primarily features stories about Sir Edward Grey, an agent of Queen Victoria and paranormal investigator, although on one occasion it included The Burial of Katharine Baker, which is about another witchfinder, Henry Hood. The Mysteries of Unland was one of the few Hellboy Universe stories in which Mike Mignola was not involved in the writing. In August 2016, Chris Roberson began his run on the series in a more long-term capacity.

Sledgehammer 44
First published in March 2013, Sledgehammer 44 is about the Vril Energy Suit "Epimetheus", more commonly known as "Sledgehammer", set in 1944.

Frankenstein
In 2015 a new title was released, Frankenstein Underground, following the story of Frankenstein's Monster. This character has previously appeared in Hellboy: House of the Living Dead. In 2020 a second miniseries, Frankenstein Undone, was announced and later canceled after issue #2 due to Mignola's refusal to continue working with writer Scott Allie.

Rise of the Black Flame
In June 2016, Rise of the Black Flame was announced, a five-issue miniseries exploring the history of the Black Flame and the cult around him.

The Visitor: How & Why He Stayed
In October 2016, The Visitor: How & Why He Stayed was announced, a five-issue miniseries about the alien Hellboy met in Conqueror Worm.

Rasputin: The Voice of the Dragon
In July 2017, a five-issue miniseries, Rasputin: The Voice of the Dragon, was announced for November that year.

Koshchei
During an interview in 2015, Mike Mignola announced he was working on a Koshchei the Deathless miniseries. This was confirmed in July 2017 with the announcement of a six-issue miniseries drawn by Ben Stenbeck. On the final page of 2021's Sir Edward Grey: Acheron, a new miniseries, Koshchei the Deathless in Hell was announced. With the formal announcement in August 2022, the miniseries was retitled Koshchei in Hell.

Crimson Lotus
Crimson Lotus was announced in July 2018 during a series of announcements commemorating the 25th anniversary of Hellboy's first appearance.  Crimson Lotus marks the first time a Hellboy Universe series has borne the name of a female character.

The Sarah Jewell Mysteries
In February 2021, Dark Horse announced The House of Lost Horizons: A Sarah Jewell Mystery. Though it is written as a standalone title, it is planned to be a series.

The Sword of Hyperborea
In October 2021, Dark Horse announced The Sword of Hyperborea. The story continues on after the end of B.P.R.D.: The Devil You Know, following the history of Agent Howards' mysterious sword, beginning with his prehistoric counterpart, Gall Dennar. This title is the Hellboy Universe debut of writer Rob Williams.

The British Paranormal Society
Bloody Disgusting announced The British Paranormal Society: Time Out of Mind in January 2022, a miniseries that would focus on the characters Simon Bruttenholm (uncle of Trevor Bruttenholm) and Honora Grant from Sir Edward Grey: Witchfinder.

The Amazing Screw-On Head
Originally a stand-alone one-shot published May 15, 2002, The Amazing Screw-On Head was later revealed to be fiction within the Hellboy Universe, created Walter Edmund Heap in 1899, as revealed in Hellboy in Hell. Mike Mignola has also mentioned that the short story The Magician and the Snake is not canon, but rather a fairy tale in the Hellboy Universe.

Other
While Hellboy: Weird Tales is out of continuity, a pair of canon stories, How Koshchei Became Deathless and Baba Yaga's Feast, were collected in the Hellboy: Weird Tales hardcover omnibus in November 2014.

Any Hellboy crossovers, guest appearances, novels (excepting Christopher Golden's three novels) and role-playing games are not considered within continuity.

Awards

In other media

Films

Live action
Guillermo del Toro originally directed two live action films, 2004's Hellboy and its 2008 sequel. Del Toro had planned to do a third film to complete a trilogy of films, but he was unable to secure funding. The film franchise was rebooted in 2019 with new Hellboy film directed by Neil Marshall.

Animation
There were a pair of Hellboy Animated films, Sword of Storms and Blood and Iron. The Phantom Claw, a planned third film, was abandoned. The Hellboy Animated continuity was further expanded in a series of digest-sized comics.

See also
List of Hellboy comics
Hellboy publishing history

Notes

References

 Stephen Weiner & Jason Hall, Hellboy: The Companion, May 21, 2008 
 Dark Horse's Hellboy website
 Shaun Manning, "Hell(boy) on Earth" - PART 1, PART 2, PART 3, PART 4, PART 5, Comic Book Resources, December 7–17, 2010
 Kiel Phegley, CCI: Hellboy, The B.P.R.D. and Beyond, Comic Book Resources, August 5, 2010
 Kiel Phegley, "To Hellboy and Back" - PART 1, PART 2, PART 3, PART 4, PART 5, PART 6, PART 7, Comic Book Resources, March 22 – June 18, 2010

1993 comics debuts
Fictional elements introduced in 1993
Fictional universes